The 2022 Tennessee gubernatorial election was held on November 8, 2022, to elect the governor of Tennessee. Incumbent Republican Governor Bill Lee was reelected to a second term with 64.9% of the vote, improving on his performance from 2018. The primary elections took place on August 4, 2022, with Lee and Democrat Jason Martin winning their respective parties' nominations. Lee was sworn in for his second term on January 21, 2023.

During the general election, Lee flipped reliably Democratic Haywood County, home to Brownsville. It is one of only two remaining counties in Tennessee, along with Shelby County, with a majority African-American population. Haywood County has not voted Republican on a presidential level since 1972. Martin won only Shelby and Davidson Counties. 

Voter turnout for the 2022 midterm elections in Tennessee was the lowest it has been in nearly a decade, with only 38.61% of Tennessee's registered voters turning out. The last time turnout was this low in Tennessee was in the 2014 midterm elections. This turnout was far below the 2020 presidential election in Tennessee, which saw a turnout of 69.3%. Tennessee's neighboring state Alabama saw a significant drop in voter turnout as well, with only 38.5% of Alabamians turning out to vote this midterm cycle.

Republican primary

Candidates

Nominee
Bill Lee, incumbent governor

Disqualified
Curtis Carney, business owner
Tyler Hagerman
Patricia Morrison

Declined
Andy Ogles, Mayor of Maury County (successfully ran for U.S. House)

Endorsements

Results

Democratic primary

Candidates

Nominee
Jason Martin, pulmonologist and critical care specialist at Sumner Regional Medical Center and former Meharry Medical College professor

Eliminated in primary
Carnita Atwater, leader of New Chicago Community Development Corporation in Northern Memphis
J. B. Smiley Jr., Memphis city councilor

Withdrew
Casey Nicholson, minister

Declined
 Gloria Johnson, state representative (endorsed Jason Martin)

Endorsements

Results

Independents

Candidates

Declared
Constance Every, nonprofit founder
John Gentry, accountant
Basil Marceaux, businessman and perennial candidate
Alfred O'Neil
Deborah Rouse, candidate for President of the United States in 2020
Michael Scantland, sales manager
Rick Tyler, perennial candidate (also running for U.S. House)
Charles Van Morgan, small business owner

Disqualified
Lemichael DaShaun-Wilson
Hosie Holomon III
Wendell Jackson
Jake Johns

General election

Predictions

Endorsements

Polling

Bill Lee vs. generic opponent

Results

By county 

Counties that flipped from Democratic to Republican
 Haywood (largest city: Brownsville)

See also
 Elections in Tennessee
 Political party strength in Tennessee
 Tennessee Democratic Party
 Tennessee Republican Party
 Government of Tennessee
 2022 United States House of Representatives elections in Tennessee
2022 Tennessee Senate election
2022 Tennessee House of Representatives election
 2022 Tennessee elections
2022 United States gubernatorial elections
 2022 United States elections

Notes

References

External links 
Official campaign websites
 Bill Lee (R) for Governor
 Bill Marceaux (I) for Governor
 Jason Martin (D) for Governor

2022
Tennessee
Gubernatorial